Brownsville is a populated place in Marlboro County, South Carolina, United States.

Geography
 
Brownsville is located at latitude 34.392 and longitude -79.592. The elevation is 135 feet.

Demographics

References

External links
 

Unincorporated communities in Marlboro County, South Carolina
Unincorporated communities in South Carolina